Sons of New Mexico is a 1949 American Western film directed by John English and written by Paul Gangelin. The film stars Gene Autry, Gail Davis, Robert Armstrong, Dick Jones, Frankie Darro and Irving Bacon. The film was released on December 20, 1949, by Columbia Pictures.

Plot

Cast
Gene Autry as Gene Autry
Gail Davis as Eileen MacDonald
Robert Armstrong as Pat Feeney
Dick Jones as Randy Pryor 
Frankie Darro as Gig Jackson
Irving Bacon as Chris Dobbs
Russell Arms as Chuck Brunton
Marie Blake as Hannah Dobbs
Clayton Moore as Rufe Burns
Sandy Sanders as Walt 
Roy Gordon as Major Hynes
Frank Marvin as Joe
Paul Raymond as Brad
Pierce Lyden as Watson
Kenne Duncan as Ed
Champion as Champ

References

External links
 

1949 films
American Western (genre) films
1949 Western (genre) films
Columbia Pictures films
Films directed by John English
American black-and-white films
Films shot in Ventura County, California
1940s English-language films
1940s American films